Straight Shooter is the fourth studio album by James Gang, which was released in July 1972 on ABC Records in the US and Probe Records in the UK.  This is the first James Gang album recorded after their guitarist/keyboardist/vocalist Joe Walsh left the band and went on to form the band, Barnstorm.  The remaining members, Dale Peters (bass guitar and backing vocals) and Jim Fox (drums and organ) were joined on this album by ex-Bush singer Roy Kenner and guitarist Domenic Troiano.  Bush, whose lone album was released in the United States by ABC's subsidiary label Dunhill Records, had broken up at about the same time as Walsh left the James Gang, so Kenner's and Troiano's joining Peters and Fox effectively merged the remnants of the two bands.

Critical reception

Reviewing for Allmusic, critic Stephen Thomas Erlewine wrote of the album "the band was saddled by a noticeable lack of strong material, since none of the members could write songs with memorable hooks."

Track listing
All songs by Roy Kenner and Domenic Troiano, except where noted.

Personnel 
 Roy Kenner – lead vocals (all but 5), percussion
 Domenic Troiano – guitars, backing and lead (5) vocals
 Dale Peters – bass guitar, backing vocals, percussion
 Jim Fox – drums, backing vocals, percussion, keyboards
Additional personnel
 Sheldon Kurland – violin
 Glen Spreen - strings
Engineering
 Gene Eichelberger - Engineering, Remixing
Cover artwork
 Jim Flournoy Holmes - Cover artwork
 David Powell - Cover artwork

Charts

References

James Gang albums
1972 albums
Albums with cover art by James Flournoy Holmes
ABC Records albums